Jack Scroby (1936 – 25 April 2020)  was an English rugby union and professional rugby league footballer who played in the 1950s, 1960s and 1970s, and coached rugby league in the 1970s.

Background
Jack Scroby was born in Halifax, West Riding of Yorkshire, England.  After playing rugby union at junior level, he played amateur rugby league for Ovenden and Siddal before turning professional in 1955 with Bradford Northern.

Playing career
Scroby played for Bradford from 1955–1959 making 104 appearances before joining Halifax for a then club record fee of £7,500. At the time Scroby was serving in the army and played for the British Army rugby union team against the Royal Navy and the Royal Air Force.  During his 315 appearances for Halifax between 28 August 1959 and 28 February 1970, he scored 22 tries. He played in one Championship final - in 1965 when Halifax beat St. Helens 15–7 at Station Road, Swinton on Saturday 22 May 1965.

Scroby was capped seven times for Yorkshire.

Coaching career
Scroby played his last match in February 1970, before leaving to coach Huddersfield and later returned to Halifax., later he was Chris Anderson's assistant during the glory days of the late 1980s, and then had 10 years as the club’s timekeeper. 

He also coached the Yorkshire side during the mid-1970s.

Halifax Hall of Fame
Jack Scroby is a Halifax RLFC Hall of Fame inductee.

References

External links
Keith Neller meets up with some Fax past Players
Cup winners back together
Rugby League Heritage Lunch Club

1936 births
2020 deaths
Army rugby union players
Bradford Bulls players
Duke of Wellington's Regiment soldiers
English rugby league coaches
English rugby league players
Halifax R.L.F.C. coaches
Halifax R.L.F.C. players
Huddersfield Giants coaches
Rugby league locks
Rugby league props
Rugby league second-rows
Rugby league players from Halifax, West Yorkshire
Yorkshire rugby league team coaches
Yorkshire rugby league team players